Mary Louise Day (February 19, 1968 - 2017) was an American teenager who, at age 13 in 1981, mysteriously disappeared from her home in Seaside, California. She was found alive in 2003, a little more than twenty-two years after her disappearance.

Childhood
Mary Day was born in Little Falls, New York on February 19, 1968, to Charlotte Day (né Pressler) and her husband Charles Day. She had two younger sisters, Kathy and Sherrie. Day and her sisters did not have easy childhoods; they were in and out of foster homes in their early years because their mother was often unable to care for them.

At some point while the girls were in foster care, Charlotte divorced from Charles and remarried to a man named William Houle. In 1975 Houle enlisted in the United States Army, and Charlotte attained permanent and full custody of Mary and Kathy shortly thereafter. In 1978, the family moved to Hawaii due to Houle being stationed there. By this time, Sherrie had been legally adopted by one of her foster families (the Calgaros) and was thereby separated from her birth family.

While in Hawaii, Charlotte gave birth to a son, William Jr., and a daughter, Billie Jean. Her biological father Charles Day was killed in an accident during this time, leaving inheritance money to Mary and Kathy. They would refer to this money as their escape plan and use the code word "Mohawk" when discussing it.

In December 1980, Mary was removed from her mother and stepfather's care and taken into protective custody after it was discovered that William was physically abusing her. The family then moved to Seaside, California following a change in William's base, but Mary was kept in Hawaii until a few months later, when she was sent to live with the rest of her family in California. While Mary was in Seaside, she frequently attempted to run away from her home but would always be returned by police officers.

Disappearance
On or around July 15, 1981, Mary Day disappeared from her home in California. Her parents did not report her missing, and almost no one aside from them knew she was missing. In 1994, Sherrie Calgaro filed a missing persons report but by then thirteen years had passed and police did not launch an investigation. Sherrie sent information about Mary Day and a photo of her to the National Center for Missing and Exploited Children in late 1999, at which point an image of how Mary might have looked at the time was developed. This age-progressed image depicted her at age 31.

Sherrie Calgaro spoke to police regarding Mary's disappearance and an official investigation was opened in 2002. Her family were the only ones who knew about her disappearance; their neighbors were unable to recall them and did not recognize pictures of Mary, who had not been enrolled in school while living in Seaside.

Kathy was able to give a more detailed account of the night of Mary Day's disappearance. She and Mary stayed home while William, Charlotte, and their two siblings went out to dinner. When they returned, William's dog, of which he was very fond, began presenting with signs of physical illness that made him appear to be dying. William became extremely angry and accused Mary of poisoning the dog, after which he began to beat her. Kathy said William began to yell, scaring her, shortly after which "all hell broke loose." She further said she remembered the fight between Mary and William, and that Mary had been yelling. She concluded by stating that the last time she saw Mary, she had blood coming out of her mouth. The next morning, Kathy said, Mary Day was no longer in the house. When she asked her mother where Mary went, Charlotte told her that Mary ran away and to never speak her name again. Sometime after, the family moved to New York, where Sherrie Calgaro visited them. She noticed that Mary was not with them and asked Charlotte where Mary was, and Charlotte again said that Mary had run away. When Sherrie attempted to ask Kathy, she replied that they were not allowed to speak about Mary Day. Sherrie Calgaro told police that she remembered her mother proclaiming that she knew of locations in California in which one could hide a corpse and never have it be found. Following this, Sherrie began to believe her sister Mary was murdered.

Investigation
After interviewing both Kathy and Sherrie, investigators also began to believe that Mary had been murdered on the night of her disappearance. In addition to Kathy and Sherrie, investigators were able to track Charlotte and William Houle down to Kansas, where they were interviewed by local police. Charlotte reported not remembering many of the facts regarding her missing daughter’s disappearance, and that the last time she saw Mary was in 1981 when she ran away. She admitted that she and William should have taken steps to locate Mary after her initial disappearance. She went on to claim that William had filed a runaway report with the Salinas police department, but there was no record of anyone reporting her missing prior to 1994.

It was assumed that Charlotte and William chose to not report Mary missing because they were cashing her Social Security benefits at the time of her disappearance. However, investigators and Mary's siblings thought they had been hiding something sinister about Mary's disappearance, enforced by Charlotte saying in her interview, "If [Mary’s] dead, she’s dead." When police questioned William, he initially claimed that on the night of Mary’s disappearance he had been checking each bedroom and noticed Mary was not in hers. He said he and Charlotte panicked and contacted police, but there was no record of such a phone call and William would later admit to beating Mary on the night she was last seen. He explained that he was extremely angry over his dog’s illness and, blaming her, viciously beat her. He said that Mary attempted to leave the house and that he used a martial arts technique to try and subdue her, specifically a chokehold.

The morning after Mary went missing, Charlotte told William she saw "Satan" in his eyes the night before and likened it to him being “possessed by a demon.” When asked if he could have killed Mary, he denied it. He was then asked if the demon inside of him could have killed her and he responded in the affirmative. Kathy told investigators that shortly after Mary went missing, William told the children to not go in a specific corner of the home’s backyard. Investigators brought her back to the old home in 2003 and she directed them to the corner. Cadaver dogs were brought in and they detected the scent of human remains in the area. When police dug there, they uncovered a small child's shoe. The shoe appeared to be a tennis shoe, and Kathy said they often wore that type of footwear as children. Investigators believed they had enough evidence to build a credible homicide case and began to compile one against Charlotte and William Houle.

Reappearance
On November 25, 2003, a pickup truck was pulled over as a routine traffic stop. The truck had stolen license plates, leading to the police collecting and examining the identifications of the passengers. One of the passengers was a woman whose Arizona state identification card bore the name Mary Day; this also contained the missing Mary’s birth date and other pertinent information. The woman was detained and when she was interviewed, she claimed she ran away from her home to avoid abuse from Charlotte and William Houle. Investigators were skeptical as to the credibility of her accounts, owing to the fact that she had a thick southern accent; Mary Day did not have such an accent. Police also discovered that her identification had been issued three weeks prior to her arrest, which is around the time the homicide investigation began.

Investigators initially theorized that the woman was an imposter and took DNA samples in order to determine whether or not her claim was true. Her DNA was compared to that of Charlotte Houle, which revealed that the woman was a biological child of hers. The investigation into Mary's disappearance was closed and her two sisters invited her to live with them in North Carolina. Despite the DNA match, Kathy and Sherrie also had doubts of Mary’s true identity due to her southern accent. Kathy did not believe Mary since she did not remember much from her childhood, including the inheritance and the codeword "Mohawk,” whereas Sherrie noticed that Mary’s magazines were shipped to the name "Monica Devereaux" but seemingly did not notice that the alias shared initials with “Mary Day.”

Mary Day died in 2017; no funeral was held.

See also
List of solved missing person cases

References

1968 births
2017 deaths
1980s missing person cases
Formerly missing people
Missing American children
Missing person cases in California